Žuglići is a village in the municipality of Jablanica, Bosnia and Herzegovina. It is located on the north shore of Jablaničko lake

Demographics 
According to the 2013 census, its population was 42, all Bosniaks.

References

Populated places in Jablanica, Bosnia and Herzegovina